Khalid Ahmad (5 June 1943 – 19 March 2013) was a Pakistani Urdu poet and a newspaper journalist.

Early life and career
Ahmad was a newspaper columnist at the daily newspaper Nawa-i-Waqt at Lahore, Pakistan, where he used to write his column 'Lamha Lamha'. He also was a poet and a playwright. Two sisters of Khalid Ahmad Hajra Masroor and Khadija Mastoor are internationally famous Urdu language fiction writers. He received his MSc (Masters of Science) degree and joined Water and Power Development Authority, (a government agency), as an employee at Lahore, Pakistan.

Selected bibliography
 Daraaz Palkoun Ke Saey Saey 
 Aik Muthi Hawa
 Pehli Sada Parinday Ki 
 Hathailyoun Par Chiragh
 Tashbeeb
 Jadeed Tar Pakistani Adab
 Num Grifta
 Kajol Ghar

Ahmad had been publishing his monthly magazine 'Bayaz' for the last 22 years.

Awards and recognition
 For his literary services, he has been awarded the Pride of Performance by the President of Pakistan in 2011.

Death
Ahmad died on 19 March 2013 after suffering from lung cancer for a few months. At the time of his death, he was survived by his wife, two sons and a daughter.

References

1943 births
2013 deaths
Deaths from lung cancer in Pakistan
Pakistani male journalists
Pakistani poets
Pakistani dramatists and playwrights
Urdu-language poets from Pakistan
20th-century poets